The Province of Milan was a province in the Lombardy region, Italy. Its capital was the city of Milan. The area of the former province is highly urbanized, with more than 2,000 inhabitants/km2, the third highest population density among Italian provinces, just below the densities of the provinces of Naples and of Monza e Brianza, the latter of which was created in 2004 from the north-eastern part of the province of Milan. On 1 January 2015 the province was replaced by the Metropolitan City of Milan.

Geography 
The Province of Milan extended over the Po Valley and was bordered by the river Ticino to the west, and the  river Adda to the east. It was shaped by its waterways - river and canals that traverse it and sometimes border it, from the Lambro and Olona rivers to the numerous canals, like the Navigli Milanesi; these water runs link farmsteads and villages like Corneliano Bertario, the Castello Borromeo (castle) and ancient noble villas (such as the Inzago Villa near the Naviglio Martesana) to the Canale Villoresi, which is thought to be the longest man-made canal in Italy. The Villoresi is the natural southern border of Brianza, an area in Lombardy noted for its mountains, lakes and plains.

It contains six regional natural parks: Parco Adda Nord, Parco Agricolo Sud Milano, Parco delle Groane, Parco Nord Milano, Parco della Valle del Lambro and the Parco Lombardo della Valle del Ticino.
Half of the province is agricultural and flood plain, and most of it is protected by reserves.

Largest municipalities by population

See also
Milan metropolitan area
 Metropolitan City of Milan

References

External links

Milan Quality of Life and Info Sheet

 
.
Milan
Milan
2015 disestablishments in Italy
Populated places disestablished in 2015